Dani Dayan (born 29 November 1955) is an Argentine-Israeli entrepreneur and Consul General of Israel in New York since August 2016 and Yad Vashem chairman since August 2021. Dayan is an advocate for the establishment and maintenance of Israeli settlements in the West Bank. He served as the Chairman of the Yesha Council from 2007 to 2013. In 2013, he resigned as Chairman of the Yesha Council to endorse Benjamin Netanyahu for Prime Minister. Dayan was subsequently appointed as Chief Foreign Envoy  of the Yesha Council, as the only official representative of the Israeli settlement movement to the international community. After a diplomatic stand-off over its assignment of former settler leader Dayan as ambassador to Brazil without consulting the government of Brasilia, Israel backed off and in March 2016 assigned Dayan as Consul General of Israel in New York.

Described by The New York Times as "worldly and pragmatic" and "the most effective leader the settlers have had." Dayan is perceived by many to be the face of the Israeli settlement movement to the international community. His writing appears in many publications, including The New York Times, The Los Angeles Times, The Boston Globe, USA Today, The Guardian, Breitbart,<ref>EXCLUSIVE – Israeli Envoy Dani Dayan: Airbnb Decision to Delist West Bank Jewish Homes Has 'Anti-Semitic Flavor''', Breitbart, 21 November 2018.</ref> Haaretz, The Times of Israel and The Jerusalem Post''.

Early life
Dayan was born in Buenos Aires, Argentina. He and his family immigrated to Israel in 1971, when he was 15, settling in the Tel Aviv neighborhood of Yad Eliyahu. Dayan spent 7.5 years in the Israeli Army. He is a cousin of journalist Ilana Dayan.

Dayan holds a B.Sc in Economics and Computer Science from Bar Ilan University, and an M.Sc in Finance from the Tel Aviv University. He is a Major (Res.) in the Israel Defense Forces.

Despite being a key figure in the largely religious settlement movement, Dayan is secular, although not an atheist. He lives in Ma'ale Shomron, an Israeli settlement in the West Bank.

Business career
In 1982, Dayan established an information technology firm "Elad Systems", which he headed, first as CEO and later as Chairman, until 2005, when he sold his interests in the company. He continues to invest in high-tech companies and serves as a lecturer at Ariel University.

Political career
Dayan was the Secretary-General of the Tehiya political party, and was a candidate to the Knesset on its list in the Israeli legislative elections in 1988 and 1992.

Dayan was a member on the Executive Committee of the Yesha Council for eight years, before being elected as Chairman on July 13, 2007. As Chairman he led the settlers' struggle against the Settlement freeze in 2010. Following his election, Dayan began transforming the council into an effective political lobby, modeled on American political lobbies. Dayan resigned in 2013, but at the same time created a new post for himself as the foreign face of the settler movement. He opposes a two-state solution, and believes that holding onto the West Bank is in Israel's best interest.

Dayan attempted a run for the Knesset on the Jewish Home slate in the March 2015 elections. Ultimately, he was not elected. In the 2021 Israeli legislative election, Dayan was placed on the eleventh spot of the New Hope Party List.

Diplomatic career
In 2015 Dayan was appointed by Prime Minister Benjamin Netanyahu to be the Israeli ambassador to Brazil, pending approval of the Brazilian government. Concerned with his political trajectory as a representative of Israeli settlement communities, the Brazilian government delayed its approval of Dayan's appointment over months, sparking a diplomatic crisis between both countries. Furthermore, his appointment faced opposition by leftist sectors of the political coalition governing Brazil, as well as social movements. In January 2016, 40 retired Brazilian ambassadors from all political spheres released a manifesto supporting the Brazilian government.

Brazil's reluctance to approve Dayan as Israel's Ambassador developed into a diplomatic rift between the two countries. In December 2015, Israel's acting Foreign Minister MK Tzipi Hotovely announced that steps would be taken to apply more pressure on Brazil to approve the appointment of Dayan to the post. The standoff continued until March 2016, when Israel backed off and assigned Dayan as Consul General of Israel in New York.

Personal life
Dayan is married to Einat Dayan, a former political activist who works as the director of strategy, marketing, and sales at Ariel University. They have a daughter, Ofir, who served in the IDF Spokesperson's Unit and is studying at Columbia University. His father was Ambassador Moshe Dayan and his grandfather, Aryeh Dayan, was the cousin of Shmuel Dayan, who was the father of the Israeli general Moshe Dayan. He is a cousin of journalist Ilana Dayan.

References

1955 births
Living people
Argentine emigrants to Israel
Argentine Jews
Academic staff of Ariel University
Bar-Ilan University alumni
Israeli businesspeople
Israeli Jews
Israeli people of Argentine-Jewish descent
Israeli settlers
People from Buenos Aires
People from Tel Aviv
Politics of Israel
Secular Jews
Tel Aviv University alumni
Dayan family